House of D is a 2004 coming-of-age comedy-drama film directed by David Duchovny as his directorial debut. The film stars Duchovny, Anton Yelchin, Téa Leoni, Erykah Badu, Frank Langella, Zelda Williams, and Robin Williams. It was screened at the 2004 Tribeca Film Festival.

Plot
An American artist living a bohemian existence in Paris, Tom Warshaw (David Duchovny) is trying to make sense of his troubled adult life by reflecting upon his extraordinary childhood.

Prompted by his son's 13th birthday, Tom experiences a flashback to Greenwich Village in 1973, as 13-year-old Tommy (Anton Yelchin), he is on the brink of becoming a man. While his bereaved single mother (Téa Leoni) mourns the death of his father, Tommy escapes grief by causing trouble at school and making afternoon deliveries with his best friend Pappas (Robin Williams), a mentally challenged janitor.

Following the romantic advice offered by Lady (Erykah Badu) – incarcerated in the infamous New York Women's House of Detention for shadowy reasons – Tommy experiences his first taste of love. Yet when an unexpected tragedy radically alters his world, Tommy must take a life-defining choice – one that will compel the adult Tom, thirty years later, to confront his unfinished past.

Cast
 David Duchovny as Tom Warshaw (Adult)
 Anton Yelchin as Tommy Warshaw (Young)
 Robin Williams as Pappas
 Téa Leoni as Mrs. Warshaw
 Erykah Badu as Lady / Bernadette
 Adam LeFevre as Monty
 Frank Langella as Rev. Duncan
 Zelda Williams as Melissa
 Orlando Jones as Superfly
 Willie Garson as Ticket Agent
 Andrée Damant as French Woman in Window

Critical reception

House of D was given a score of 10% on Rotten Tomatoes with a consensus calling it "A sincere but inept coming of age story." Box Office Mojo gives the reviews a C+. Many critics attribute the poor reception to the fact that Duchovny wrote and directed the movie, which gave it a lack of creative direction and caused it to meander and to lose focus.

Box office
The film was released in theaters on April 15, 2005. It grossed $36,371 during its opening week. The next week it grossed $7,441. In the film's third week, it grossed $210,826, the most during its run. In the film's fourth and final week, it grossed $30,386, a total of $389,199 worldwide.

DVD release
The DVD was released on October 4, 2005. The DVD contains special features, such as commentary with David Duchovny and the cast and a behind-the-scenes featurette called The Making of House of D.

References

External links
 Official site
 
 
 Review by Roger Ebert

2004 films
2004 directorial debut films
2000s coming-of-age comedy-drama films
American coming-of-age comedy-drama films
Films set in 1973
Films directed by David Duchovny
Films scored by Geoff Zanelli
Lionsgate films
2000s English-language films
2000s American films